Vórtice Marxista (Marxist Vortex) is the first b-sides album by Argentine rock group Babasónicos. It consists of tracks that were left out of their first two albums: Pasto and Trance Zomba.

Track listing
 "Larga Siesta" (Long Nap)
 "Fioritos"
 "Antonio Fargas"
 "La Muerte es Mujer" (Death is a Woman)
 "Chingolo Zenith"
 "Los Clonos de J.T." (The Clones of J.T.)
 "Forajidos de Siempre" (Usual Outlaws)
 "Cerebros en Su Tinta" (Brains in Their Ink)
 "Traicionero" (Treacherous)
 "Fórmica"
 "Bananeado" (Banana-ed)

References

1998 albums
Babasónicos albums